Job shops are typically small manufacturing systems that handle job production, that is, custom/bespoke or semi-custom/bespoke manufacturing processes such as small to medium-size customer orders or batch jobs. Job shops typically move on to different jobs (possibly with different customers) when each job is completed. Job shops machines are aggregated in shops by the nature of skills and technological processes involved, each shop therefore may contain different machines, which gives this production system processing flexibility, since jobs are not necessarily constrained to a single machine. In computer science the problem of job shop scheduling is considered strongly NP-hard.

A typical example would be a machine shop, which may make parts for local industrial machinery, farm machinery and implements, boats and ships, or even batches of specialized components for the aircraft industry.  Other types of common job shops are grinding, honing, jig-boring, gear manufacturing, and fabrication shops.

The opposite would be continuous continuous-flow manufacturing, such as textile, steel, food manufacturing and manual labor.

Advantages

High flexibility in product engineering
High expansion flexibility (machines are easily added or substituted)
High production volume elasticity (due to small increments to productive capacity)
Low obsolescence (machines are typically multipurpose)
High robustness to machine failures

Compare to transfer line.

Disadvantages
Difficult scheduling due to high product variability and twisted production flow
Low capacity utilization

Compare to transfer line.

See also
Job-shop scheduling
Production line
Workflow

Further reading
A. Portioli, A. Pozzetti, Progettazione dei sistemi produttivi, Hoepli 2003
N.A. Buzacott, G.E. Shanthikumar, Stochastic models of manufacturing systems, Prentice Hall, 1993

External links
Job Shop and CAD
Electrical Discharge Machining Job Shop

Manufacturing